St. James is an unincorporated community and census-designated place (CDP) in Charlevoix County in the U.S. state of Michigan. The population of the CDP was 145 at the 2020 census.  The community is located within St. James Township.

Located on the northern coast of Beaver Island in Lake Michigan, St. James was the county seat of Manitou County during the county's existence from 1855 to 1895.

History
The community was setted as early as 1847 when James Jesse Strang took over his Mormon church and settled his colony on Beaver Island.  Originally part of Michilimackinac County, it received a post office named Beaver Island on January 13, 1849 with Charles Wright serving as the first postmaster.  Strang named the new community after himself, and the post office was renamed St. James on October 10, 1854 when it became part of Emmet County.  Strang declared himself to be a king—the only king ever crowned in the United States.  After Strang's murder in 1856 by disgruntled followers, the community began to fold, and the post office closed on March 6, 1868.  Charles Wright restored the post office under the name Beaver Island on December 19, 1868 and served again as postmaster.  During the 1870s, St. James was also referred as Beaver Harbor.  By 1895, the Mormons left the island, and St. James became part of Charlevoix County. It is now a resort community. 

The community of St. James was listed as a newly-organized census-designated place for the 2010 census, meaning it now has officially defined boundaries and population statistics for the first time.

Geography

St. James is located in St. James Township at the northern end of Beaver Island, the largest island in Lake Michigan. The center of town faces southeast onto St. James Harbor, through which the Beaver Island Ferry arrives from Charlevoix. The northeastern side of the entrance to the harbor is marked by the Beaver Island Harbor Light.

Demographics

Education
St. James is served entirely by Beaver Island Community School.  The Beaver Island Community School is located within St. James and serves the entire district.  It is one of only four insular school districts in the state, along with Bois Blanc Pines School District, Grosse Ile Township Schools, and Mackinac Island School District.

References

Unincorporated communities in Charlevoix County, Michigan
Unincorporated communities in Michigan
Census-designated places in Charlevoix County, Michigan
Census-designated places in Michigan
Former county seats in Michigan
Michigan populated places on Lake Michigan
Populated places established in 1847
1847 establishments in Michigan
Church of Jesus Christ of Latter Day Saints (Strangite)